Dul-e Gap (also Romanized as Dūl-e Gap; also known as Dovol-e Bozorg) is a village in Mamulan Rural District, Mamulan District, Pol-e Dokhtar County, Lorestan Province, Iran. At the 2006 census, its population was 33, in 7 families.

References 

Towns and villages in Pol-e Dokhtar County